George Ticknor (17911871) was an American academician and Hispanist.

George Ticknor may also refer to:

 George Ticknor (journalist) (18221866), American lawyer and journalist
 George Ticknor Curtis (18121894), American historian and lawyer

See also
 George Tickner (born 1946), American rock guitarist and songwriter